Hybognathus is a genus of ray-finned fish in the family Cyprinidae. Its members are collectively known as the silvery minnows. Hybognathus are pelagophils that are native to North America. The populations of such pelagophils, including species of Hybognathus, continue to decrease in their natural habitats.

Species 
 Hybognathus amarus (Girard, 1856) (Rio Grande silvery minnow)
 Hybognathus argyritis Girard, 1856 (Western silvery minnow)
 Hybognathus hankinsoni C. L. Hubbs, 1929 (Brassy minnow)
 Hybognathus hayi D. S. Jordan, 1885 (Cypress minnow)
 Hybognathus nuchalis Agassiz, 1855 (Mississippi silvery minnow)
 Hybognathus placitus Girard, 1856 (Plains minnow)
 Hybognathus regius Girard, 1856 (Eastern silvery minnow)

References 

 
 Platania, Steven & Mortensen, Jacob & Farrington, Michael & Brandenburg, W. & Dudley, Robert. (2020). Dispersal of stocked Rio Grande Silvery Minnow (Hybognathus amarus) in the Middle Rio Grande, New Mexico. The Southwestern Naturalist. 64. 31. 10.1894/0038-4909-64-1-31.

 
Fish of North America
Taxonomy articles created by Polbot